The 1991 FA Cup final saw Tottenham Hotspur win the FA Cup for a then-record eighth time, by beating Nottingham Forest 2–1 at Wembley in the 110th FA Cup Final.

Tottenham's triumph made them the first club to win the trophy eight times, though this record has since been surpassed by Arsenal and Manchester United. The win also continued the club's trend of winning major trophies in years ending in "1", although Tottenham have yet to win the trophy or reach the final in any year since, though they did reach the EFL Cup Final in 2021.

The 1991 final was Nottingham Forest's first appearance in the FA Cup final since their triumph 32 years earlier and they have not reached the final since.

It also gave Tottenham their first campaign in a European competition – the 1991–92 European Cup Winners' Cup – of the post-Heysel era.

Route to the Final

Nottingham Forest
In all results below, the score of the finalist is given first.

Tottenham Hotspur
In all results below, the score of the finalist is given first.

Match summary
Spurs were more than £20million in debt and had struggled in the league during the second half of the 1990-91 season, but Paul Gascoigne's goals throughout the competition helped them reach the final. Gascoigne was so pumped up for this match that he almost ended his involvement in the first few minutes. In winning the ball out on the right touchline, he followed through with his foot up and caught Garry Parker in the chest. Referee Roger Milford let him off with a lecture, but failed to calm Gascoigne, who scythed down Gary Charles as the Forest defender ran across the face of the Spurs penalty area. Forest were awarded a free kick on the edge of the box but once again Gascoigne was let off without further punishment from the referee. Before play resumed, Gascoigne received extensive treatment on his knee before standing up to join the defensive wall.

Gascoigne paid for his rash challenge, which many thought deserved a red card, when Stuart Pearce smashed home the subsequent free kick, through a gap in the wall (caused by Forest player Lee Glover, who had stood in the wall, shoulder-charging Gary Mabbutt, who was stood on the end, to the ground) to give Forest the lead. Gascoigne had to leave the field on a stretcher shortly after the match restarted, as he could not put any weight on his leg. It was later revealed that he had torn his cruciate ligaments. Nayim – later notable for his winning last-minute goal against Arsenal in the 1995 UEFA Cup Winners' Cup Final – came on to replace him. Gascoigne's injury would rule him out for the entire 1991–92 season as well as the 1992 European championships. It would also prove to be the last game he played for Tottenham; he had been on the radar of Italian club Lazio during the 1990–91 season, and finally made his £6million move to Italy in the summer of 1992.

After 25 minutes Gary Lineker correctly had a goal disallowed for offside and then five minutes later he was in on Mark Crossley, when the goalkeeper brought him down in the box. Lineker stepped up to take the resulting penalty and placed the ball to the keeper's left, where Crossley dived and kept the ball out. Crossley became only the second goalkeeper to save a penalty in an FA Cup Final at Wembley, after Dave Beasant for Wimbledon in 1988. After the interval, Nayim cushioned a kick from Erik Thorstvedt into the path of Paul Allen, who put Paul Stewart in on the right hand side of the box. Stewart drilled a low shot past Crossley into the corner of the net to put Tottenham on level terms.

With the game finishing at 1–1 after normal time, the final moved into extra time. Substitute Paul Walsh looped a header over the keeper, but the ball hit the bar and bounced back only for it to be put behind by Pearce for a corner. Nayim took it and Stewart met it at the near post to flick it on. As Mabbutt ran in at the far post, he was poised to head the ball home, but Forest defender Des Walker beat him to it and diverted the ball past his own keeper to give Tottenham the lead for the first time in the game.

Tottenham saw out the rest of the game and won the FA Cup for the 8th time in their history.

Justin Edinburgh was the last member of Tottenham's cup winning team to leave the club, finally departing in 2000 – the same year that Nottingham Forest's Ian Woan became the last player from his team's side to leave them. Edinburgh died in June 2019 at the age of 49.

Match details

Long-term impact on football 'fashion'

This game also saw the first appearance of the much longer 'baggy' style of shorts, sported as part of Tottenham Hotspur's new Umbro kit, which Terry Venables helped design. Though attracting some ridicule at first, the style swiftly became popular, being adopted during the early 1990s throughout English and world football by every team at every level (with no team anywhere having reverted to the 'short shorts' worn ubiquitously for some decades up to this match).

References

External links
Game facts at soccerbase.com

Final
FA Cup Finals
FA Cup Final 1991
FA Cup Final 1991
1991 sports events in London
FA Cup Final